Clare Baker (23 November 1885 – 7 December 1947) was an English cricketer. He played 38 first-class matches for Middlesex between 1906 and 1912.

See also
 List of Middlesex County Cricket Club players

References

External links
 

1885 births
1947 deaths
English cricketers
Middlesex cricketers
People from Marylebone
Cricketers from Greater London
Marylebone Cricket Club cricketers